Otto Neumann (28 August 1902 – 12 April 1990) was a German sprinter who competed at the 1928 Summer Olympics. He won a silver medal in the 4 × 400 m relay and failed to reach the final of the individual 400 m event.

Neumann won the national titles in 400 m (1922 and 1924), 4 × 400 m relay (1927–28) and 400 m hurdles (1928). Besides running he played four international football matches and then worked as a football coach for SV Waldhof Mannheim and SV Amicitia 09 Viernheim.

In 1939 Neumann graduated with a diploma in physical education. He later became a professor and director of the Institute of Physical Education in Karlsruhe, and an honorary professor at the University of Heidelberg, where in 1950 he founded the basketball club USC Heidelberg. His wife Maria and both sons Fritz and Hannes played basketball. Hannes later became a basketball coach and professor in sports science.

References

External links
 

1902 births
1990 deaths
German male sprinters
Olympic silver medalists for Germany
Athletes (track and field) at the 1928 Summer Olympics
Olympic athletes of Germany
Medalists at the 1928 Summer Olympics
Sportspeople from Karlsruhe
Olympic silver medalists in athletics (track and field)
German football managers
SV Waldhof Mannheim managers
VfR Mannheim managers